Natural sequence may refer to:
Natural sequence of tenses, in grammar
Natural Sequence Farming

See also
Natural number
Sequence (disambiguation)